Rama VII Bridge is a bridge over the Chao Phraya River in Bangkok and Nonthaburi, in Thailand, connecting the Bang Sue District and Bang Phlat District. The roadway is in a dual carriageway configuration, with 3 lanes in each direction. The bridge was named in honour of King Prajadhipok. The bridge was constructed to ease the increase in road traffic volumes on the adjacent Rama VI bridge.

References

Bridges in Thailand
Bridges completed in 1992
Crossings of the Chao Phraya River